Gerry Ryan was an Irish presenter.

Gerry Ryan may also refer to:

Gerry Ryan (footballer), Irish footballer
Gerry Ryan (businessman), Australian businessman

See also
Jeri Ryan (born 1968), actress
Gerald Ryan (disambiguation)